is a Japanese short track speed skater.

Fujimoto competed at the 2006 and 2010 Winter Olympics for Japan. In 2006, he was a member of the 5000 metre relay team, which was disqualified in the semifinal. In 2010, in both the 500 metres and 1000 metres, he placed fourth in his heat, failing to advance. In the 1500 metres, he placed 3rd in his opening heat, advancing to the semifinals, where he finished 6th, again failing to advance. His best overall finish was in the 1500, where he placed 17th.

As of 2013, Fujimoto's best performance at the World Championships came in 2009, when he won a bronze medal as a member of the Japanese 5000 metre relay team. His best individual finish is 11th, in the 2009 1000 metres

As of 2013, Fujimoto has two podium finishes on the ISU Short Track Speed Skating World Cup. His best finish is a silver, in the 500 metres at Jeonju in 2006–07. His top World Cup ranking is 13th, in the 1000 metres in 2008–09.

World Cup Podiums

References 

1985 births
Living people
Japanese male short track speed skaters
Olympic short track speed skaters of Japan
Short track speed skaters at the 2006 Winter Olympics
Short track speed skaters at the 2010 Winter Olympics
Asian Games medalists in short track speed skating
Asian Games silver medalists for Japan
Short track speed skaters at the 2011 Asian Winter Games
Medalists at the 2011 Asian Winter Games
World Short Track Speed Skating Championships medalists
People from Kumamoto Prefecture